Alain Carminati (born 17 August 1966 in Champagnole, France) is a French former international rugby union and rugby league footballer. He played as a Flanker and Number 8.

He earned his first cap with the French national team on 23 October 1986 against Romania at Bucharest. He was called for the 1987 Rugby World Cup, where France was runners-up to New Zealand.

Honours 
 French Champions: 1993 with Castres
.
.
 French Cup: 1986 with AS Béziers
 Coupe Latine: 1995
 Five Nations Championship: 1988 and 1989

References

External links

1966 births
Living people
French rugby league players
French rugby union players
France international rugby union players
XIII Catalan players
Rugby union flankers
Rugby union number eights
RC Narbonne players
CA Brive players
AS Béziers Hérault players
Castres Olympique players
Sportspeople from Jura (department)